is a Japanese professional squash player. In June 2019, he was world ranked No. 263, and No. 2 in Japan. He won the 2018 Japanese Nationals and the 2019 Golden Open.

References

1997 births
Living people
Japanese male squash players
Squash players at the 2018 Asian Games